Codăești is a commune in Vaslui County, Western Moldavia, Romania. It is composed of four villages: Codăești, Ghergheleu, Pribești and Rediu Galian.

Natives include communist politician Ana Pauker (1893-1960), and mathematician and member of the Romanian Academy, Radu Miron (b. 1927).

References

Communes in Vaslui County
Localities in Western Moldavia